The designation (d) after the name means the member is deceased.